Nomia aurantifer is a species of bee in the genus Nomia, in the family Halictidae. It occurs in Australia and Southeast Asia.

References

aurantifer
Insects described in 1910